Route 42 is a highway in central Missouri.  Its eastern terminus is at Route 28 south of Belle; its western terminus is at US 54 in Osage Beach.

Route Description
Route 42 begins at the interchange of US 54 in Osage Beach. It intersect at the terminus of Route 134 which allows access to the Lake of the Ozarks State Park. It passes through Brumley and Iberia where it intersects with Route 17 in Iberia. Route 42 has a brief concurrency with Route 133. Route 42 passes through Vienna where it intersects with US 63. Route 42 ends at Route 28 south of Belle.

Major intersections

References

042
Transportation in Miller County, Missouri
Transportation in Maries County, Missouri